Johannes Walbaum (born February 18, 1987 in Neuss) is a German footballer who plays for FC Wegberg-Beeck. He previously played for Fortuna Düsseldorf

References

1987 births
Living people
German footballers
Fortuna Düsseldorf players
3. Liga players
Association football defenders
FC Wegberg-Beeck players
Sportspeople from Neuss
Footballers from North Rhine-Westphalia
21st-century German people